Rivacindela is a genus of beetles in the family Cicindelidae, containing the following species, all of which are found only in Australia:

 Rivacindela aurifodina Sumlin, 1997 
 Rivacindela avita Sumlin, 1997 
 Rivacindela blackburni Sloane, 1906 
 Rivacindela browni Sloane, 1913 
 Rivacindela cardinalba Sumlin, 1987 
 Rivacindela cibdela Sumlin, 1997 
 Rivacindela collita Sumlin, 1987 
 Rivacindela eburneola Sumlin, 1997 
 Rivacindela gagei Sumlin, 1997 
 Rivacindela gairdneri Freitag, 1979 
 Rivacindela gillesensis Hudson, 1994 
 Rivacindela hudsoni Sumlin, 1997 
 Rivacindela igneicollis Bates, 1874 
 Rivacindela igneicolloides Sumlin, 1992 
 Rivacindela jungi Blackburn, 1901 
 Rivacindela labyrintha Sumlin, 1997 
 Rivacindela leucothrix Sumlin, 1997 
 Rivacindela necopinata Sumlin, 1997 
 Rivacindela nudohumeralis Sumlin, 1997 
 Rivacindela ozellae Sumlin, 1987 
 Rivacindela praecipua Sumlin, 1997 
 Rivacindela pseudotrepida Sumlin, 1997 
 Rivacindela saetigera Horn, 1893 
 Rivacindela salicursoria Sumlin, 1987 
 Rivacindela shetterlyi Sumlin, 1997 
 Rivacindela trepida Sumlin, 1997 
 Rivacindela trichogena Sumlin, 1997 
 Rivacindela vannidekiana Sumlin, 1988 
 Rivacindela velox Sumlin, 1987 
 Rivacindela webbae Sumlin, 1997

References

Cicindelidae